Pine Creek is a tributary of the West Branch Susquehanna River in Potter, Tioga, Lycoming, and Clinton counties in Pennsylvania. Within Tioga County,  of Pine Creek are designated as a Pennsylvania Scenic River.

Pine Creek is the largest tributary of the West Branch Susquehanna River and has the largest watershed of all the West Branch’s tributaries.

Name
Pine Creek is named for the many pine trees that lined (and now again line) much of its banks. The Iroquois called Pine Creek Tiadaghton, which according to Owlett, either meant "The River of Pines" or "The Lost or Bewildered River". Pine Creek is the largest "creek" in the United States.

Geography
It flows southeast  to Galeton, where it receives its first major tributary, the West Branch Pine Creek. It then flows east  to Tioga County and the village of Ansonia.

At the village of Blackwell, Pine Creek receives its third major tributary, Babb Creek. At Waterville it receives its fourth major tributary, Little Pine Creek. Pine Creek continues south and forms part of the border between Lycoming and Clinton counties.

Its confluence with the West Branch Susquehanna River is at this border, between the boroughs of Avis (in Clinton County, to the west) and Jersey Shore (in Lycoming County, to the east).

The difference in elevation——divided by the length of the creek——gives an average drop or relief ratio of 22.0 ft/mi (4.2 m/km ). The meander ratio is 1.08, so the creek is fairly straight in its bed.

Watershed

Recreation
Pine Creek and Pine Creek Gorge (also known as the Grand Canyon of Pennsylvania) are a popular outdoor recreation destination. The West Rim Trail is a  hiking trail along the west rim of the Pine Creek Gorge.

The Pine Creek Rail Trail runs beside the creek through the gorge from Ansonia to Jersey Shore. The railroad through the gorge opened in 1883 as the Jersey Shore, Pine Creek and Buffalo Railway, passing into the control of the Fall Brook Coal Company in 1884, and the New York Central Railroad via a lease in 1899, with full integration into the NYC in 1914. Conrail took over the line in 1976, and the last train ran through the gorge on October 7, 1988.

History
The Fair Play Men were illegal settlers (squatters) who established their own system of self-rule from 1773 to 1785 in the West Branch Susquehanna River valley of Pennsylvania in what is now the United States. Because they settled in territory claimed by Native Americans, they had no recourse to the Pennsylvania colonial government. Accordingly, they established what was known as the Fair Play System, with three elected commissioners who ruled on land claims and other issues for the group. In a remarkable coincidence, the Fair Play Men made their own declaration of independence from Britain on July 4, 1776, beneath the "Tiadaghton Elm" on the west bank of Pine Creek, very near the mouth.

Bridges
 The Bridge in Porter Township was built in 1889.
 The Bridge in Brown Township was built in 1890.
 The English Center Suspension Bridge was built in 1891.

See also
List of rivers of Pennsylvania

References

External links

U.S. Geological Survey: PA stream gaging stations
Pine Creek Gorge official website
The Columbia Gazetteer of North America, 2000, entry on Pine Creek
Pennsylvania Scenic Rivers website

Rivers of Pennsylvania
Tributaries of the West Branch Susquehanna River
Scenic Rivers of Pennsylvania
West Branch Susquehanna Valley
Rivers of Potter County, Pennsylvania
Rivers of Tioga County, Pennsylvania
Rivers of Lycoming County, Pennsylvania
Rivers of Clinton County, Pennsylvania
Allegheny Plateau
Protected areas of Potter County, Pennsylvania
Protected areas of Tioga County, Pennsylvania
Protected areas of Lycoming County, Pennsylvania
Protected areas of Clinton County, Pennsylvania